The Equity Party, often known by the transliteration of its Arabic name, "El Insaf", is a political party in Mauritania. It was founded on 3 July 2022 after the governing Union for the Republic rebranded itself ahead of the 2023 Mauritanian parliamentary election.

It is led by the then government spokesperson and minister of Education Mohamed Melainine Ould Eyih, who left his cabinet positions to focus on the leadership of the party ahead of the 2023 Mauritanian parliamentary election.

Leadership

President
 Mohamed Melainine Ould Eyih (3 July 2022-)

References

Political parties in Mauritania
Political parties established in 2022